Vyacheslav Andreyevich Yakimov (born 5 January 1998) is a Russian football player. He plays for FC Fakel Voronezh on loan from FC Krasnodar.

Club career
He made his debut in the Russian Football National League for FC Krasnodar-2 on 10 March 2019 in a game against FC Tom Tomsk.

He made his Russian Premier League debut for FC Krasnodar on 12 December 2021 against FC Nizhny Novgorod.

On 5 December 2022, Yakimov joined FC Fakel Voronezh on loan until the end of the 2022–23 season, with an option to buy.

Career statistics

References

External links
 
 Profile by Russian Football National League
 

1998 births
Sportspeople from Krasnodar Krai
Living people
Russian footballers
Association football midfielders
FC Krasnodar-2 players
FC Krasnodar players
FC Fakel Voronezh players
Russian Second League players
Russian First League players
Russian Premier League players